The Cecil County Public Library (CCPL) is a public library system in Cecil County, Maryland, located in the northeastern tip of Maryland.

CCPL has circulated over a million items since FY2009, serving the community through seven branch libraries, a bookmobile, and an e-branch. The Cecil County Public Library provides events, classes, reference services, and materials for adults, teenagers, and children. In 2011, CCPL received a Best Library Blog Award from Salem Press, as well as a Best of Show Award from the American Library Association for their "My Library, My Lifeline" advocacy logo.

The Friends of the Cecil County Public Library is a non-profit membership group dedicated to promoting Cecil County's library system. Volunteer members advocate, educate, and raise funds on behalf of the Library, its patrons, and the larger community. The Friends raise funds to be used by the Cecil County Public Library for activities not ordinarily covered under the Library's operating budget.

References

External links
Cecil County Public Library
Cecil County Government
Maryland AskUsNow!

Buildings and structures in Cecil County, Maryland
Public libraries in Maryland
Education in Cecil County, Maryland